Mara-Palnik is a rural locality (a village) in Bolshekochinskoye Rural Settlement, Kochyovsky District, Perm Krai, Russia. The population was 95 as of 2010. There are 4 streets.

Geography 
Mara-Palnik is located 32 km east of Kochyovo (the district's administrative centre) by road. Puzym is the nearest rural locality.

References 

Rural localities in Kochyovsky District